Présentevillers is a commune in the Doubs department in the Bourgogne-Franche-Comté region in eastern France.

Geography

Population

See also
 Communes of the Doubs department

References

External links

 Présentevillers on the intercommunal Web site of the department 

Communes of Doubs
County of Montbéliard